Fidelity Trust Building is a historic bank building located in Indianapolis, Indiana. It was built in 1914–1915, and is an eight-story rectangular Classical Revival style building faced in white glazed brick and terra cotta. At the time of its listing, the building housed J. Pierpont's Restaurant and Bar.

It was listed on the National Register of Historic Places in 1980. and is located in the Washington Street-Monument Circle Historic District.

References

Individually listed contributing properties to historic districts on the National Register in Indiana
Bank buildings on the National Register of Historic Places in Indiana
Neoclassical architecture in Indiana
Commercial buildings completed in 1915
Commercial buildings in Indianapolis
National Register of Historic Places in Indianapolis